The Late Show is an American late-night talk show and the first television program broadcast on the then-new Fox Network. Originally hosted by comic actress Joan Rivers, it first aired on October 9, 1986, under the title The Late Show Starring Joan Rivers. It is also the first late-night show hosted by Arsenio Hall.

Background
The talk show was a direct attempt at competing against NBC's The Tonight Show Starring Johnny Carson, where Rivers had been Carson's permanent guest host since 1983. The show was initially broadcast live.

Many in 1986, including top executives at NBC, thought it was possible that Johnny Carson would retire after reaching his 25th anniversary on October 1, 1987, as it was such a logical cut-off point. In spring 1986, a confidential memo between top NBC executives listing about 10 possible successors in the event of Carson's retirement the next year was leaked. Rivers was shocked to see that she was not on the list.

In an article she wrote for People magazine, Rivers said that NBC offered her only a one-year contract in 1985 as permanent guest host while Carson's contract had been renewed for two years, which signaled to her that her future was uncertain as her previous one year contracts had run the same length as Carson's. In addition, Rivers noted numerous snubs from NBC executives over the years, such as not being invited to the annual Carson party until recently, and taking the fall for a controversial joke that management approved during rehearsal. Rivers had received higher-paying offers from other networks in prior years but declined them out of her loyalty to Carson, but in 1986 as NBC was unwilling to give assurances on her future and negotiations were fruitless, this was the impetus for Rivers to seriously consider the Fox offer.

Rivers and Carson
Fox was looking for a host for a late-night talk show for the network's launch in October 1986. Through its purchase of Metromedia, it had been clearing The Merv Griffin Show (a syndication stalwart for two decades) but opted to drop that program (leading to its cancellation) to make room for its own show. The new network offered Rivers the job at a salary higher than what NBC was paying. She accepted and Carson was blindsided by the news when he saw the press conference on television. Moments later, when Rivers called him at home, he refused to take the call.

Carson was furious when he found out about Rivers going to Fox. Carson stated that he felt betrayed by Rivers – not because she dared to compete with him, but because she was not honest with him beforehand about her intentions and did not ask him for advice and his blessing. For her part, Rivers was adamant that her problem was with NBC and not with Carson, who was like a father figure to her. She stated that she didn't want to tell Carson before the announcement was made because she was afraid Fox would cancel the deal if word leaked out. She had previously been ordered by Carson's producers and lawyers not to go to him with her problems, as they kept Carson completely insulated since he was a major source of NBC profits; thus Carson had been completely unaware of Rivers' problems with NBC.

When others obtained their own competing shows (such as David Brenner, Alan Thicke, Joey Bishop, and Pat Sajak), Carson always had them on The Tonight Show beforehand to wish them luck – and again after he had forced their show into cancellation by maintaining superior ratings. Rivers did not appear on the Tonight Show again during the remainder of Carson's tenure after 1986 or during that of his successors (in this case, Jay Leno and subsequently, Conan O'Brien) until February 17, 2014, when she appeared in a cameo on Jimmy Fallon's first show, by which point Carson had been dead for nine years.  This blacklisting extended to The Late Show with David Letterman on CBS, Carson's handpicked successor.  Carson continued to be friends and support Letterman and in 2004, a few weeks before Carson died, Rivers appeared on Letterman's show and made no mention of their incident, her show, or their falling out.

Rivers spoke highly of Carson the night he died on January 23, 2005, but revealed that he never spoke to her again.

History

Sagging ratings and carriage refusals

After a moderate start, ratings for the talk show soon sagged. The ratings struggles also made it hard for Fox to attract affiliates for its primetime launch on April 5, 1987. Some prospective affiliates, such as Milwaukee's WCGV-TV, would only sign with the network if they did not have to carry The Late Show. KPTM in Omaha refused outright out of loyalty to Carson, who hailed from Corning, Iowa, east of Omaha and started his career on local radio and television. The network acquiesced to allow some stations out of that obligation so that the network launched in primetime with as many affiliates as possible, at the cost of ratings and access to The Late Show.  For instance, at the time the show launched Fox had not closed on its purchase of its Boston station, WXNE-TV (now WFXT).  That station's previous owners, the Christian Broadcasting Network, objected to the show's content and refused to clear it.  As a result, until Fox took control of the station in January, its audio feed aired on a low-rated AM station.

The behind-the-scenes relations between Rivers and network executives quickly eroded and Rivers was fired in May 1987. For the final show, which aired May 15, 1987, the set was vandalized with toilet paper, slime, and shaving cream. Her guests were Howie Mandel, Pee-Wee Herman, then-fledgling comedian Chris Rock, Wendy O. Williams, and show stage manager Michelle Aller as her alter-ego Mavis Vegas Davis.  Soon afterward the program was renamed The Late Show and featured rotating guest hosts including Suzanne Somers, Richard Belzer, and Robert Townsend. After firing prospective guest host Frank Zappa, producer John Scura replaced him with Arsenio Hall, who made his debut as a talk show host. Eventually, Hall was named the permanent replacement host in mid-1987.

The Howard Stern Show

On April 16, 1987, a meeting was held between Howard Stern and management of WNYW, Fox's flagship television station. The network was considering Stern as replacement to The Late Show. Five one-hour pilots titled The Howard Stern Show were recorded at a cost of about $400,000. They featured rock guitarist Leslie West of Mountain fame as band leader and Steve Rossi as announcer and singer. By early June, air dates were yet to be scheduled; the pilots were instead being tested among focus groups in California. With no formal announcement, in July, the network decided not to put the Stern show on the air. Paul Noble, the former executive producer for WNYW, was never told of Fox's decision. "By today's standards, they were absolutely tame." He also said, "They were not the kind of thing that a local New York television station was prepared to get involved with at that time. It was more like off-the-wall radio."

Arsenio Hall
Fox had originally cancelled The Late Show, but executives were stunned by the success of Hall, who was performing well among adults 18–49. In return, Hall was given a 13-week deal to host the show – however, a replacement program entitled The Wilton North Report was already in pre-production and scheduled, which meant that the deal would not be extended beyond that. Further, Hall would not be available in any event, as he was committed to filming the Eddie Murphy feature Coming to America.  During the monologue of his final appearance as host, Hall stated that the reason he had agreed to only do 13 weeks was because that was as long as he was able to stay, as he had plans "to do other things."

Clint Holmes continued as announcer while Mark Hudson remained as band leader. However, the band's name changed from "Mark Hudson and the Party Boys featuring the Tramp" – as it had been known during Rivers's tenure, with "the Tramp" referring to baritone sax player Beverly Dahlke-Smith – to simply "Mark Hudson and the Late Show Band".

Guests tended to be third-string actors, with performances by lesser-known bands such as The Williams Brothers (Los Angeles) and The Amazing Pink Things (Seattle). One noteworthy guest during Hall's era was Bob Barker, then in his fifteenth year as host of the long-running game show The Price is Right.

World-famous "Earthquake Astrologer from KROQ and KFOX", Farley Malorrus, appeared as a guest following an accurate earthquake prediction in Los Angeles during October 1987.

When problems developed with Wilton North, Fox attempted to bring back Hall – but it was too late. Wilton North debuted on December 11, 1987, and was a disaster on all fronts.  Fox canceled it after only 21 episodes on January 8.  It started airing Late Show repeats with both Hall and Rivers on January 11, 1988, and scrambled to revive the talk show.

1988 hosts
The show came back with a new group of unknown guest hosts, including comedians Jeff Joseph and John Mulrooney; Daniel Rosen took over as announcer, while Jack Mack and the Heart Attack became the new house band. Ultimately, none of the tryout hosts would work out, and the network turned to Seattle TV personality Ross Shafer to take over The Late Show.

Ross Shafer
By the time Shafer began hosting, ratings were so low that the show could only attract newsmakers and human interest-style guests; this led to a format change in the summer to focus on tabloid and ripped-from-the-headlines stories.

Fox canceled the show effective October 28, 1988, getting out of late night until 1993, when it launched the ill-fated The Chevy Chase Show.

Notable episodes
Despite the show's low ratings by 1988, Shafer's tenure as host produced six notable episodes. These are especially notable for being the last public appearances of well-known celebrities:
 The movie Leonard Part 6 won three Golden Raspberry Awards on April 10, 1988, for Worst Actor (Bill Cosby), Worst Picture, and Worst Screenplay (Jonathan Reynolds and Cosby). It was nominated for two more Razzie Awards, for Worst Supporting Actress (Foster) and Worst Director (Weiland). A few weeks after the ceremony, Cosby accepted his three Razzies on The Late Show. He requested that the three Razzies he earned be specifically made out of 24 karat (99.99%) gold and Italian marble.
 A reunion of the 1960s Batman TV series cast (Adam West, Burt Ward, Frank Gorshin, Julie Newmar, Yvonne Craig, Alan Napier, and Eartha Kitt) aired on April 28. Napier, who had been long-retired at this point and very frail when this special was recorded, died on August 8 after being checked into a hospital two months earlier. Yvonne Craig described the reunion show as overbooked, and when Ross Shafer finally turned his attention to Napier, it was only to ask him a silly question, then cut him off abruptly as he was telling a story, much to Napier's annoyance. Because Cesar Romero had other commitments at the time, he was instead interviewed by Shafer from his home. Also interviewed was Batmobile customizer George Barris. 
 A reunion of the Gilligan's Island cast aired on May 18 with a custom set, audience members and a barbershop quartet singing the theme, cast member trivia, and more. This would be the last appearance of all the regular cast members together, including Tina Louise, who had distanced herself from the rest of the cast since the show ended, and Jim Backus, who was suffering from Parkinson's disease. Backus died in July 1989; Alan Hale, Jr. died in January 1990, Natalie Schafer died in April 1991, Bob Denver died in September 2005, Russell Johnson died in January 2014, and Dawn Wells died in December 2020.
 A "Game Show Hosts" special featuring Gene Rayburn, Gary Owens, Tom Kennedy, Dennis James, and Jim Lange, plus Encyclopedia of TV Game Shows co-author Fred Wostbrock. Various clips were shown, including rare footage of James' Name That Tune. (Shafer would later succeed Rayburn as host of Match Game.) James died in 1997, while Rayburn died in 1999, Lange died in 2014, Owens died in 2015, Wostbrock died in 2016, and Kennedy died in October 2020.
 Artist Mark Kostabi's appearance, where he wrapped Shafer in aluminum foil and threw large amounts of cash into the studio audience. Some of this footage resurfaced in the documentary film about Kostabi, Con Artist, directed by Michael Sladek.
 A reunion of the cast of National Lampoon's Animal House (Tim Matheson, Martha Smith, Stephen Furst, James Daughton, and John Vernon) in honor of its tenth anniversary, which aired on October 6.

Aftermath
Edgar Rosenberg, Rivers's husband and the show's producer during her tenure, committed suicide on August 14, 1987, three months after Rivers and he were fired, and shortly after the couple separated. Rivers made the first of several career comebacks with the debut of The Joan Rivers Show in daytime on September 5, 1989.  The show was nominated for numerous Emmy Awards with Rivers winning the Daytime Emmy Award for Outstanding Talk Show Host in 1990.

The Arsenio Hall Show launched on January 3, 1989. Hall had sealed a deal with Paramount Television to launch his own show and was able to clear it on many Fox affiliates throughout the country. He essentially reclaimed his old time period, though not in the network.

Ross Shafer went on to host a revival of Match Game for ABC in 1990.

The title of The Late Show was revived by CBS in 1993 for their unrelated late-night talk show franchise The Late Show for David Letterman and since 2015 for Stephen Colbert.

See also
 List of late night network TV programs

References

External links
 The Late Nightlife Tonight Show
 

1986 American television series debuts
1988 American television series endings
1980s American late-night television series
English-language television shows
Fox late-night programming
Television series by 20th Century Fox Television